Siapiccia is a comune (municipality) in the Province of Oristano in the Italian region Sardinia, located about  northwest of Cagliari and about  east of Oristano.

Siapiccia borders the following municipalities: Allai, Fordongianus, Ollastra, Siamanna, Simaxis.

Demographic evolution

References

Cities and towns in Sardinia
1975 establishments in Italy
States and territories established in 1975